Accel-KKR is an American technology-focused private equity firm with over $14 billion in total assets under management. The firm invests primarily in middle-market software and technology-enabled services businesses, providing capital for buyouts and growth investments across a range of opportunities including recapitalization, divisional carve-outs, and going-private transactions.  The company has offices in Menlo Park, California, (headquarters), Atlanta, Georgia (opened in 2006), Mexico City (opened in 2018), and London (opened in 2013).

History
The firm was founded in February 2000 as a partnership between the venture capital firm Accel Partners and Kohlberg Kravis Roberts, one of the oldest and largest leveraged buyout firms. Since the mid-2000s, the firm has operated independently of its original backers. Today the firm is run by co-managing partners Tom Barnds and Rob Palumbo with headquarters in the San Francisco Bay Area.

Accel-KKR’s second fund closed in 2006 with over $300 million in capital commitments and its third fund closed in 2008 with $600 million, a third over its $450 million target. In 2012, the firm closed its fourth fund with $750 million, exceeding its target of $700 million.
 
In 2015, Accel-KKR raised $1.3 billion for its fifth buyout fund, including $100 million from the firm’s general partners, making it the largest general partner commitment to date. The fund also drew a third of its capital from outside the US.

Since the firm’s inception through 2015, Accel-KKR had reported a 32% annualized return on investment.

In May 2017, Goldman Sachs Asset Management's Petershill unit took a minority stake of less than 10% in Accel-KKR. 

In January 2020, Accel-KKR closed on $276.7 million in commitments for Accel-KKR Credit Partners LP – Series 1, its private lending vehicle, which targets maturing software startups whose collateral may fall short of what bank lenders require for loans. Also in 2020, the firm closed on its first fund intended specifically to invest in smaller companies. The $640 million Accel-KKR Emerging Buyout Partners LP fund is focused on software and technology companies with enterprise values of $70 million or less.

In February 2022, the firm closed on $1.35 billion in commitments for its fourth growth fund, Accel-KKR Growth Capital Partners IV LP and in March raised $1.77 billion for Continuation Vehicle IV, aimed at follow-on investments in seven companies from a 2013 buyout fund: Abrigo, Vitu, Kerridge, ESG, IntegriChain, ClickDimensions and TrueCommerce.

As of 2022, Accel-KKR has raised over $14 billion of investor commitments and invested in or acquired over 300 software and technology-enabled services companies, with companies primarily based across North America, Europe, Australia and New Zealand. Of those, Accel-KKR has completed 80 international transactions, including 48 in Europe, 11 in Canada, 12 in Australia/NZ/Asia-Pacific, 6 in Latin America and 2 in South Africa.

Management
Tom Barnds is founder and Co-Managing Partner of Accel-KKR. Prior to Accel-KKR, Barnds was a Managing Director at Nassau Capital, a private equity firm responsible for investing $2.5 billion of Princeton University’s endowment, and ran the business development division for medical supply provider McGaw Inc. Barnds currently sits on the boards of FastSpring, Imed, Kerridge Commercial Systems, Kimble, Lemontech, Mavenlink, NAVTOR, Recurly, Siigo, Smart Communications, Springbrook Software, TELCOR, Vendavo and Vitu. In 2021, he was named one of the Top 100 Stanford MBA Alumni in Finance and Investing.

Recognition
In 2019 and 2020, Inc. named Accel-KKR one of the “50 Best Private Equity Firms for Entrepreneurs” while the American Chamber of Commerce in New Zealand recognized the firm as “Investor of the Year from the USA” in 2019 for its investment in Seequent Ltd. Accel-KKR was also named the "2019 GP-Led Deal of The Year in the Americas" by Private Equity International in recognition of Accel-KKR Capital Partners CV III fund, which closed in September 2019. In 2021, Accel-KKR was named among Inc.’s annual list of Top Founder-Friendly Investors. Accel-KKR’s sale of Seequent was named "2021 International Deal of the Year" by Buyouts magazine. Under Accel-KKR’s ownership, the New-Zealand-based medical imaging business grew into a global software provider of 3D geological models and analytics used in mining, civil engineering and energy industries before being sold to Bentley Systems for a total value of USD$1.05 billion.

Current Portfolio Companies
Accel-KKR’s current portfolio companies include:

Abrigo
ATP
Birdeye
Cendyn
ClickDimensions
Drips
Endalia
Entersekt
ESG
ESO Solutions
FastSpring
FM Systems
Forcura
Friss
GPS Insight
HumanForce
IMED
IntegriChain
Kaleris
Kantata
Kerridge Commercial Systems
Lemontech
Masabi
Navtor
Ontraport
OrthoFi
Paymentus
Partnerize
Pegasus
Peppermint Technology
PropLogix
Reapit
Recurly
SafeGuard
Salary.com
Sandata
Siigo
Smart Communications
Springbrook
SugarCRM
Surgical Information Systems 
TELCOR
ToolsGroup
TrueCommerce
Unimarket
Uptick
Vendavo
Vistex
Vitu
Xtiva
Yes Energy

Selected Previous Investments

Previous investments from which Accel-KKR has since exited include:
Vyne sold to TJC
Abila sold to Community Brands for over $280 MM in 2017 
Cielo sold to Permira in 2019
One.com sold to Cinven in 2018
RiseSmart sold to Randstad for $100 MM in 2015
Zinc Ahead sold to Veeva Systems for $130 MM in 2015
On Center Software sold to Roper Industries for $157 MM in 2015 
Accumatica sold to EQT Partners in 2019
Patientco sold to Waystar for over $450 million in 2021
PrismHR sold to Summit Partners in 2017
Clavis Insight sold to Ascential plc in 2017
Applied Predictive Technologies sold to MasterCard for $600 MM in 2015
iTradeNetwork sold to Roper Industries for $525 MM in 2010
Endurance International Group sold to Warburg Pincus for $1 billion in 2011
Saber Corporation sold to Electronic Data Systems for $463 MM in 2007
IntrinsiQ sold to AmerisourceBergen for $35 MM in 2011
CRS Retail Systems sold to Epicor for $121 MM in 2005
Savista sold in two transactions to Torex and Accenture for $100 MM in 2006
Seequent sold to Bentley Systems for USD$1.05 billion in 2021
ShowingTime sold to Zillow Group for $500 million in 2021
Systems & Software, Inc. sold to Constellation Software in 2007
Team Software sold to Workwave in 2021
Alias Systems Corporation sold to Autodesk for $197 MM in 2006
Kana Software sold to Verint Systems for $514 MM in 2014
N-able sold to Solar Winds for $127 MM in 2013
HighJump sold to Korber for $725 MM in 2017
Jaggaer sold to Cinven for over $1.5 billion in 2019
Ektron, purchased in 2014, merged with Episerver in 2015
Episerver, purchased in 2014, sold to Insight Venture Partners for $1.16 billion in 2018
Model N, which went public on the NYSE under the ticker symbol MODN in 2013

References

Further reading
KKR and Accel Open Atlanta Office.  New York Times, July 31, 2006

External links
 Accel-KKR (company website)

Private equity firms of the United States
Venture capital firms of the United States
Financial services companies established in 2000
Kohlberg Kravis Roberts
Companies based in Menlo Park, California

fi:Accel Partners